The Meriden Hospital is a private hospital run by Circle Health. It is situated adjacent to the University Hospital Coventry, Walsgrave, Coventry, England.

History
The hospital, which was designed to have 48 beds and was built at a cost of £25 million, opened in February 2006. In April 2013 it was accused of instructing doctors to delay NHS operations to encourage patients to go private instead.

See also
 List of hospitals in England

References

Hospitals in the West Midlands (county)
Buildings and structures in Coventry
Private hospitals in the United Kingdom